Jake Simpkin (born 16 October 2001) is an Australian professional rugby league footballer who plays as a  for the Wests Tigers in the NRL.

Background
Simpkin was born in Toowoomba, Queensland and played his junior rugby league for Souths Tigers in the Toowoomba Rugby League. He attended St Mary's College, Toowoomba before being signed by the Brisbane Broncos. In 2018, while playing for St Mary's, he was named Player of the Carnival at the 2018 Confraternity Carnival.

Playing career

Early career
In 2017, Simpkin represented Queensland under-16 in their 22–16 loss to New South Wales under-16. In 2018, he played for the Western Mustangs in the Mal Meninga Cup. In 2019, Simpkin joined the Wynnum Manly Seagulls playing for their Mal Meninga Cup and Hastings Deering Colts sides. In June 2019, he represented Queensland under-18, scoring a try in their win over New South Wales under-18. On 21 August 2019, Simpkin signed with the Wests Tigers.

2021
Simpkin began the 2021 season playing for Western Suburbs in the New South Wales Cup.

2022
Simpkin played a total of nine games for the Wests Tigers in the 2022 NRL season as the club claimed the Wooden Spoon for the first time.

References

External links
Wests Tigers profile

2001 births
Living people
Australian rugby league players
Rugby league hookers
Rugby league players from Toowoomba
Wests Tigers players